John Roger (died 1414/15), of New Romney, Kent, was an English Member of Parliament for New Romney in 1407.

References

14th-century births
1414 deaths
15th-century English people
English MPs 1407
Members of Parliament for New Romney